Ville Pokka (born June 3, 1994) is a Finnish professional ice hockey defenseman, who currently plays for Färjestad BK of the Swedish Hockey League (SHL).

Playing career
Pokka played with Kärpät in the SM-Liiga during the 2010–11 season. He was drafted 23rd overall by Avangard Omsk in the 2012 KHL Junior Draft and 34th overall by the New York Islanders in the 2012 NHL Entry Draft.

On May 28, 2014, Pokka was signed to a three-year entry-level contract with the Islanders.

Prior to the 2014–15 season, on October 4, 2014, Pokka was traded, along with T. J. Brennan and Anders Nilsson by the Islanders to the Chicago Blackhawks in exchange for Nick Leddy and Kent Simpson. He was then directly assigned to Blackhawks American Hockey League (AHL) affiliate, the Rockford IceHogs.

After three seasons with the organization (all of which were spent with the IceHogs), the Blackhawks re-signed Pokka to a one-year, $650,000 contract extension on June 27, 2017.

In the 2017–18 season, Pokka was familiarly reassigned to the IceHogs. On December 13, 2017, Pokka was recalled by the Blackhawks however remained a healthy scratch before returning to Rockford on December 18. After posting 22 points in 46 games, Pokka was traded by the Blackhawks to the Ottawa Senators in exchange for Chris DiDomenico on February 15, 2018. Pokka joined the Senators AHL affiliate, the Belleville Senators, and continued to provide offense from the blueline with 3 goals and 11 points in 23 games to end the season.

As an impending restricted free agent with the Senators, Pokka opted to leave North America by agreeing to a one-year contract with his Russian KHL draft club, Avangard Omsk, on May 8, 2018.

In March 2022, Pokka left Avangard Omsk during playoffs due to the Russian invasion of Ukraine. As a free agent in the off-season, Pokka signed a one-year contract in moving to Sweden with Färjestad BK of the SHL, on 5 June 2022.

Career statistics

Regular season and playoffs

International

Awards and honors

References

External links
 

1994 births
Living people
Avangard Omsk players
Belleville Senators players
Färjestad BK players
Finnish ice hockey defencemen
New York Islanders draft picks
Oulun Kärpät players
People from Tornio
Rockford IceHogs (AHL) players
Ice hockey players at the 2022 Winter Olympics
Olympic ice hockey players of Finland
Medalists at the 2022 Winter Olympics
Olympic gold medalists for Finland
Olympic medalists in ice hockey
Sportspeople from Lapland (Finland)